N'Guessan is a surname. Notable people with the surname include:

 Dany N'Guessan (born 1987), French footballer
 Michel Amani N'Guessan (born 1957), defence minister of Côte d'Ivoire
 Pascal Affi N'Guessan (born 1953), former Prime Minister of Côte d'Ivoire